Joel Plata Rodríguez (born 20 March 1998) is a Spanish artistic gymnast who represented Spain at the 2020 Summer Olympics.

References

External links
 

Living people
1998 births
Spanish male artistic gymnasts
Gymnasts from Barcelona
Olympic gymnasts of Spain
Gymnasts at the 2020 Summer Olympics
Gymnasts at the 2022 Mediterranean Games
Mediterranean Games silver medalists for Spain
Mediterranean Games medalists in gymnastics
21st-century Spanish people